Posavina TV is a Bosnian local commercial television channel based in Brčko, Bosnia and Herzegovina. The program is mainly produced in Croatian.

External links 
 Communications Regulatory Agency of Bosnia and Herzegovina

Mass media in Brčko
Television stations in Bosnia and Herzegovina
Television channels and stations established in 2009